Comic Kairakuten is a hentai manga magazine published by Wanimagazine. It is one of the most popular magazines of its type in Japan. The magazine is published online in English by FAKKU.

Comic
The magazine was created in 1994 with work such as that of Range Murata during a trend of changing art styles in anime and manga. Comic Kairakuten name is a pun of kairaku (快楽, pleasure) and rakuten (楽天, optimism), meaning "pleasure heaven". It limits itself mostly to vanilla content. Comic Kairakuten publisher, Wanimagazine, has a hard stance towards scanlations of their hentai manga, often taking them down.

Comic Kairakuten is one of the most popular hentai manga magazines in Japan. Between October 2008 and September 2009, there were 350,000 copies in circulation. This was also the case between October 2009 and September 2010.

References

Hentai anime and manga
1994 establishments in Japan
Wanimagazine manga
Manga magazines published in Japan
Men's magazines published in Japan
Monthly magazines published in Japan